Russia has relations with all of the countries of the Middle East.  Historically it has been involved in numerous wars there, especially with Turkey and the Ottoman Empire, with Afghanistan, and recently in support of Syria.

See also
 Afghanistan–Russia relations
 Soviet–Afghan War
 Armenia–Russia relations
 Bahrain–Russia relations
 Caucasian War
 Russian conquest of the Caucasus
 Cold War in Asia (the regional aspect of the Cold War)
 Soviet Middle Eastern foreign policy during the Cold War
 Crimean War
 Crimean Khanate
 Russo-Crimean Wars
 Eastern Question, on the decline of the Ottoman Empire
 History of the Russo-Turkish wars
 Russo-Turkish War (1806–1812)
 Russo-Turkish War (1828–1829)
 Caucasus campaign
 Egypt–Russia relations
 Georgia–Russia relations
 Great Game, the rivalry between Britain and Russia over Central Asia in the 19th century
 Iran–Russia relations
 Russia and the Iran–Israel proxy conflict
 Israel–Russia relations
 Iraq–Russia relations
 Jordan–Russia relations
 Kuwait–Russia relations
 Lebanon–Russia relations
 Libya–Russia relations
 Oman–Russia relations
 Qatar–Russia relations
 Palestine–Russia relations
 Russo-Persian Wars
 Russo-Persian War (1722–1723)
 Persian expedition of 1796
 Russo-Persian War (1826–1828)
 Russia–Saudi Arabia relations
 2020 Russia–Saudi Arabia oil price war
 Russia–Syria relations
 Russian intervention in the Syrian Civil War
 Russia–Turkey relations
 Russians in Turkey
 Turks in Russia
 Russia–United Arab Emirates relations
 Russia–Yemen relations
 List of modern conflicts in the Middle East
 Foreign policy of the Russian Empire

Notes

Further reading
 Amos, Philip. “Recent Work on the Great Game in Asia.” International History Review 2#2 1980, pp. 308–320. online

 Bechev, Dimitar, et al. eds. Russia Rising: Putin's Foreign Policy in the Middle East and North Africa (I.B. Tauris, 2021) excerpt
 Fay, Sidney B. "Russia and the Middle East" Current History 10.57 (1946): 385-392 online.

 Feifer, Gregory. The Great Gamble: The Soviet War in Afghanistan (Harper Collins, 2009)
 Issaev, Leonid, and Andrey Korotayev. "Russia’s policy towards the Middle East: The case of Yemen." International Spectator 55.3 (2020): 132–147.
 Kagan, Frederick, and Robin Higham, eds. The Military History of Tsarist Russia (2008) online

 Kauppi, Mark V. and R. Craig Nation, eds. The Soviet Union and the Middle East in the 1980s (Lexington Books, 1983).
 Klieman, Aaron S. Soviet Russia and the Middle East (1970) online
 Kreutz, Andrej. Russia in the Middle East: Friend or Foe? (Praeger, 2007). online review
 Kuniholm, Bruce R. The Origins of the Cold War in the Near East: Great Power Conflict and Diplomacy in Iran, Turkey, and Greece (Princeton UP, 1980) online
 Lovotti, Chiara, ed. Russia in the Middle East and North Africa (Routledge, 2020) excerpt
 Lund, Aron. "From cold war to civil war: 75 years of Russian-Syrian relations." (Swedish Institute of International Affairs, 2019) online.
 Lund, Aron. "Russia in the Middle East" (UI Paper 2/2019, Swedish Institute of International Affairs, 2019) online
 Nizameddin, Talal. Russia and the Middle East: Towards a New Foreign Policy (St Martin's Press, 1999). online
 Nizameddin, Talal. “Squaring the Middle East Triangle in Lebanon: Russia and the Iran-Syria-Hezbollah Nexus.” Slavonic and East European Review 86#3, (2008), pp. 475–500, online.

 Primakov, Yevgeny. Russia and the Arabs: Behind the Scenes in the Middle East from the Cold War to the Present (Basic Books, 2009).
 Rezvani, Babak. "Russian foreign policy and geopolitics in the Post-Soviet space and the Middle East: Tajikistan, Georgia, Ukraine and Syria." Middle Eastern Studies 56.6 (2020): 878-899 online.
 Smolansky, O. M.  "The United States and the Soviet Union in the Middle East". Proceedings of the Academy of Political Science  (1978). 33#1: 99–109. doi:10.2307/1173976. 

 Stone, David. A Military History of Russia: From Ivan the Terrible to the War in Chechnya (2006) excerpts
 Vasiliev, Alexey. Russia’s Middle East Policy: From Lenin to Putin (Routledge, 2018). excerpt
 Vucinich, Wayne S. "Russia and the Near and Middle East.” Current History 28#162, (1955), pp. 80–88, online
 Wehling, Fred. “Three Scenarios for Russia’s Middle East Policy.” Communist and Post-Communist Studies 26#2 (1993), pp. 182–204, online.

Middle East
Foreign relations of Russia
Russian diaspora in the Middle East